The Australian Manufacturers' Championship was a motor racing title awarded by the Confederation of Australian Motor Sport (CAMS) to the winning car manufacturer in an annual series of races held throughout Australia. Whilst the first two championships were open only to Group E Series Production Touring Cars subsequent championships through to 1991 were run to the same regulations as the Australian Touring Car Championship. The title has been revived twice since then, firstly in 1994 as a championship open to 2-litre Class II Touring Cars (soon to become known as Super Touring Cars) and from 2008 as a series for production cars, incorporating the Australian Production Car Championship.

For 2016 the Australian Manufacturers' Championship has been replaced by the Australian Production Car Series.

Results
The actual name of the title was changed by CAMS a number of times as shown in the following table of championship winners.

See also 
List of Australian Manufacturers' Championship races

References 

 
1971 establishments in Australia